La Gazelle is the name of a long-distance passenger train service operated by the Congo–Ocean Railway. The train was introduced in 2012.

Route
The train runs between Brazzaville and Pointe-Noire and stops at 9 intermediate stations along the route. As of January 2014 the journey was scheduled to take either 14 or 16 hours depending on whether the service was overnight or during the day.

Rolling stock
The train uses Korean manufactured passenger railway cars which include a restaurant and bar car and has its own engine which supplies the cars with electricity for air conditioning and power outlets.

References

Gazelle
Rail transport in the Republic of the Congo
Railway services introduced in 2012